Chorion Limited was a multinational media production company with offices in London, New York, and Sydney. The company produced TV shows and feature films, and was best known for its portfolio of entertainment brands. These included children's characters such as Paddington Bear, Peter Rabbit, The Mr. Men, The Very Hungry Caterpillar, Olivia, Gaspard and Lisa and Noddy. The company also owned the rights to the Agatha Christie Estate (including the Miss Marple and Poirot characters), Raymond Chandler, and Georges Simenon.

Chorion existed initially as a diversified entertainment company, with a portfolio of Intellectual Property (IP) rights, live entertainment venues and commercial real estate. From 2002 onwards, the business was refocused towards heritage IP Rights management and media production.

History

1998–2002: Beginnings

Chorion was created on 4 April 1998 as a new name for the London-based entertainment and retail company, Trocadero PLC. The formation of the new company occurred at the same time as the acquisition of three London entertainment venues from Luminar PLC. The newly formed company owned a diverse range of assets in the entertainment industry, including the retail complex at the London Trocadero, the rights to the Enid Blyton literary estate, and several other entertainment venues, bars and nightclubs in the UK.

In June 1998, Chorion acquired the rights to the Agatha Christie literary estate, with a vision of reviving the crime brand through new TV production and exporting the property to the United States. This acquisition marked the first step towards Chorion becoming the media production company it ultimately became. It nonetheless remained a company with a diverse portfolio, as evidenced by the founding of the Tiger Tiger nightclub on London's Haymarket in late 1998. The Tiger Tiger format was expanded to other cities during 1999.

Despite the success of these nightclubs, it became increasingly clear that Chorion's business was made up of two very different divisions: a media production and rights ownership division, and an entertainment venue division. Analysts frequently cautioned that the company would not unlock its full value until these two businesses were demerged. By February 2000, Chorion sold its ownership of the loss-making Trocadero Centre back to its previous owner, Burford Holdings. Later that year, in May 2000, the management announced during an Annual General Meeting their intention to demerge the nightclub and venue business from the media business. After several delays, this process was completed in May 2002 with the venue business spun off into a new company, Urbium PLC

2002–2006: Growth

By 2002, with the company focused solely on media production, Chorion began a period of expansion driven by the acquisition of new literary properties and developing new TV and film to unlock their value. The first steps in this new direction included a series of management changes which placed experienced executives from the world of television at the helm of the company. On 4 December 2002, Chief Executive Nick Tamblyn announced his immediate resignation. Waheed Alli was initially appointed as Non-Executive Deputy Chairman. Just a few months later, in April 2003, he stepped up to the position of Chairman. Alli remained Chairman until Chorion's sale of assets, although he now also holds the position of CEO.

During this period, Chorion produced several new TV productions. In May 2002, the UK's Channel Five announced that it had bought 100 episodes of a new CGI-animated TV series based on Enid Blyton's Noddy, with the show Make Way For Noddy airing in September of that year. In November 2002, the company announced a four-year deal with major UK television network ITV to produce a few feature-length TV dramas based on the Agatha Christie novels. These began to broadcast on-air at the end of 2003. During this period, development and production also began on an animated cartoon series based on The Famous Five in collaboration with Disney Channel in France. The range of newly developed TV shows began to expand internationally, with Noddy becoming the most recognised children's character in France in 2003 and sold to Chinese publishers in 2004, and airing in the United States on PBS Kids in 2005.

As well as the commission and launch of several new TV productions, the period immediately following Waheed Alli's elevation to the Chairmanship was marked by a series of high-profile acquisitions of new properties. In April 2004, after several months of negotiations, Chorion acquired the distribution rights to the Roger Hargreaves Mr. Men series for £28 million. This acquisition was followed up in May 2005 with total ownership of the Hargreaves estate and the rights to produce new TV series.

In July 2005, Chorion made a major step towards becoming an international business when it bought UK-based Silver Lining Productions. Along with an office in New York City, this acquisition gave Chorion ownership of the media and merchandise rights to The Very Hungry Caterpillar by Eric Carle, Olivia by Ian Falconer, and Max & Ruby and Timothy Goes To School, both by Rosemary Wells.

2006–2011: Take-private and international expansion

In early 2006, Alli led a management buyout of the company backed by private equity firm 3i Group Plc. In May 2006, this process was completed when Chorion delisted from the AIM exchange to become a private limited company.

Waheed Alli served as Chief Executive Officer and Executive Chairman, and pursued a strategy of developing and launching one new children's property every year. This development strategy included the launch of a new series of Noddy in 2007, an animated version of the Mr. Men in 2008, the US launch of Olivia in 2009, the UK launch of The Octonauts in 2010, Gaspard and Lisa in 2011 and a new CGI-animated version of Beatrix Potter's Peter Rabbit in 2012.  This production was a joint venture with US broadcaster Nickelodeon and British publisher Frederick Warne & Co, part of the Penguin Group.

The launch of The Octonauts represented a big hit for the company, achieving on-air ratings for the show as number one in the key demographic of boys aged 4 to 6. Chorion announced in 2010 that they had signed international toy makers Fisher Price as the master toy partner for the brand, with a full toy line launching in the UK in August 2011.

The development of a new series of Peter Rabbit was made possible by Chorion's acquisition in November 2007 of the Copyrights Group, a competing intellectual property management company who managed the licensing and merchandising rights to the Beatrix Potter series, owned by Frederick Warne, part of the Penguin Group. The company also owned the rights to Paddington Bear, and managed Spot the Dog by Eric Hill, The Snowman by Raymond Briggs, and The Horrible Histories book series.

2011–2012: Sale of assets

On 24 August 2011, Chairman and CEO Waheed Alli along with Deputy Chairman William Astor announced to the company that they would be resigning their positions following the failure of the company's lenders to reach an agreement to restructure Chorion's debt burdens. Shortly thereafter, private equity owners 3i began a process to sell Chorion's assets.

In October 2011, Copyrights Group was reacquired by its founders, Nicholas Durbridge and Linda Pooley. In June 2016, Copyrights Group was acquired by StudioCanal.

In December 2011, Chorion sold the Mr. Men brand and its associated merchandise business to Japan's Sanrio The Agatha Christie estate was sold to Acorn Media Group, the Noddy and Olivia properties to DreamWorks Classics (formerly Classic Media, now a subsidiary of DreamWorks Animation which would be acquired by NBCUniversal in 2016), The Rosemary Wells estate to Nelvana, and the Dennis Wheatley, Margery Allingham, Nicolas Freeling and Edmund Crispin estates to The Rights House and PFD. The estate of Enid Blyton, including The Famous Five series but excluding Noddy was sold to Hachette UK in March 2012.

List of Productions

Children's estate
Peter Rabbit and The World of Beatrix Potter (sold to Silvergate Media)
Paddington Bear (now owned by StudioCanal)
Mr. Men (sold to Sanrio)
The Very Hungry Caterpillar and The World of Eric Carle (now owned by Penguin Random House)
Octonauts (sold to Silvergate Media)
Olivia (Sold to Classic Media (Later owned by DreamWorks Animation and NBCUniversal))
The Works of Enid Blyton (sold to Hachette UK, except Noddy)
Noddy (Sold to Classic Media (Later owned by DreamWorks Animation and NBCUniversal))
Malory Towers
The Famous Five
The Secret Seven
Five Find-Outers
The Works of Rosemary Wells (including Max & Ruby and Timothy Goes To School) (sold to Nelvana)
Gaspard and Lisa
Spot the Dog
The Snowman
The Story of Tracy Beaker
Maisy Mouse
Horrible Histories
Flower Fairies

Literary estates
The Works of Agatha Christie including Poirot and Miss Marple (sold to Acorn Media Group)
The Works of Margery Allingham (sold to The Rights House and PFD)
The Works of Edmund Crispin (sold to The Rights House and PFD)
The Works of Nicolas Freeling (sold to The Rights House and PFD)
The Works of Dennis Wheatley (sold to The Rights House and PFD)
The Works of Raymond Chandler including Philip Marlowe
The Works of Georges Simenon including Inspector Maigret

References

External links
Chorion website

Mass media companies established in 1998
Mass media companies disestablished in 2012
Television production companies of the United Kingdom
Film production companies of the United Kingdom
1998 establishments in the United Kingdom
2012 disestablishments in the United Kingdom